Outside backs is used to describe several playing positions in the sports of rugby league and rugby union:

 Outside backs (rugby league), the threequarters, i.e. the s, and s in rugby league football
 Outside backs (rugby union), the three-quarters, i.e. the wings, and centres in rugby union football